MacMaster can refer to:

MacMaster (surname)
MacMasters Beach, New South Wales, Australian beach
William and Annie MacMaster House

See also
McMaster (disambiguation)